"Guys Do It All the Time" is a song recorded by American country music artist Mindy McCready and written by Bobby Whiteside and Kim Tribble. The song was released on July 15, 1996, and reached the No. 1 spot on the Billboard Hot Country Singles & Tracks chart on September 14 of that year, becoming McCready's first and only Number One hit. The song was the second single from McCready's double-platinum selling debut album Ten Thousand Angels.  A video was also issued of the song (she wears boxing gloves and has shaving cream on her face), and has aired on CMT and GAC. It was later re-recorded on her fifth and final Studio Album I'm Still Here along with Ten Thousand Angels

Critical reception
Deborah Evans Price, of Billboard magazine reviewed the song favorably, saying that its "infectious, uptempo groove and clever lyric should ensure repeated play." She goes on to call McCready's voice "likeable" and says that she "delivers this song about turning the tables on men with sassy style."

Music video
The music video was directed by Jim Hershleder and premiered in June 1996.

Chart positions
"Guys Do It All the Time" debuted at number 71 on the U.S. Billboard Hot Country Singles & Tracks for the week of June 8, 1996. On the week of September 14, 1996, it reached number one and it became McCready's first and only number one hit.

Year-end charts

Parodies
American country music parody artist Cledus T. Judd released a parody of "Guys Do It All The Time" titled "Wives Do It All The Time" on his 1998 album Did I Shave My Back For This?.

References

1996 singles
1996 songs
Mindy McCready songs
Song recordings produced by David Malloy
BNA Records singles
Songs written by Kim Tribble